Indicoblemma is a genus of Asian araneomorph spiders in the family Tetrablemmidae that was first described by J. D. Bourne in 1980. It is a senior synonym of Chavia.

Species
 it contains four species, found in Asia:
Indicoblemma cruxi Lin & Li, 2010 – China
Indicoblemma lannaianum Burger, 2005 – Thailand
Indicoblemma monticola (Lehtinen, 1981) – Thailand
Indicoblemma sheari Bourne, 1980 (type) – India

See also
 List of Tetrablemmidae species

References

Araneomorphae genera
Spiders of Asia
Tetrablemmidae